Leptospermum oreophilum, commonly known as the rock tea tree, is a shrub that is endemic to the Glass House Mountains in southern Queensland. It has firm, rough bark on the older stems, elliptical leaves with a short, blunt point on the tip, relatively large white flowers arranged singly on side shoots and fruit that remains on the plant until it dies.

Description
Younger stems have minute hairs and a flange near the leaf base. Flowering mainly occurs from September to December and the fruit is a capsule  in diameter and that remains on the plant at maturity, the remains of the sepals having fallen off.

Taxonomy and naming
Leptospermum oreophilum was first formally described in 1989 by Joy Thompson in the journal Telopea. The specific epithet (oreophilum) is derived from ancient Greek, meaning "mountain-loving", referring to the mountain-top habit of this species.

Distribution and habitat
This tea-tree grows in shallow soil in rocky places on the Glass House Mountains.

Conservation status
This species is classified as "vulnerable" under the Queensland Government Nature Conservation Act 1992.

References

oreophilum
Myrtales of Australia
Flora of Queensland
Plants described in 1989
Taxa named by Joy Thompson